In mathematics, Euler's differential equation is a first order nonlinear ordinary differential equation, named after Leonhard Euler given by

This is a separable equation and the solution is given by the following integral equation

References

Equations of physics
Mathematical physics
Differential equations
Ordinary differential equations
Leonhard Euler